The German Workers' Party (DAP) was a short-lived far-right political party established in Weimar Germany after World War I. It only lasted from 5 January 1919 until 24 February 1920. The DAP was the precursor of the Nazi Party, which was officially known as the National Socialist German Workers' Party (NSDAP).

History

Origins 
On 5 January 1919, the German Workers' Party (DAP) was founded in Munich in the hotel Fürstenfelder Hof by Anton Drexler, along with Dietrich Eckart, Gottfried Feder and Karl Harrer. It developed out of the Freien Arbeiterausschuss für einen guten Frieden (Free Workers' Committee for a Good Peace) league, a branch of which Drexler had founded in 1918. Thereafter in 1918, Harrer (a journalist and member of the Thule Society), convinced Drexler and several others to form the Politischer Arbeiterzirkel (Political Workers' Circle). The members met periodically for discussions with themes of nationalism and antisemitism. Drexler was encouraged to form the DAP in December 1918 by his mentor, Dr. Paul Tafel. Tafel was a leader of the Alldeutscher Verband (Pan-Germanist Union), a director of the Maschinenfabrik Augsburg-Nürnberg and a member of the Thule Society. Drexler's wish was for a political party which was both in touch with the masses and nationalist. With the DAP founding in January 1919, Drexler was elected chairman and Harrer was made Reich Chairman, an honorary title. On 17 May, only ten members were present at the meeting, and a later meeting in August only noted 38 members attending. The members were mainly Drexler's work colleagues from the Munich railway yards.

Adolf Hitler's membership 

After World War I ended, Adolf Hitler returned to Munich. Having no formal education or career prospects, he tried to remain in the army for as long as possible. In July 1919, he was appointed Verbindungsmann (intelligence agent) of an Aufklärungskommando (reconnaissance commando) of the Reichswehr to influence other soldiers and to investigate the DAP. While monitoring the activities of the DAP, Hitler became attracted to founder Anton Drexler's anti-Semitic, nationalist, anti-capitalist, and anti-Marxist ideas. While attending a party meeting at the Sterneckerbräu beer hall on 12 September 1919, Hitler became involved in a heated political argument with a visitor, Professor Baumann, who questioned the soundness of Gottfried Feder's arguments in support of Bavarian separatism and against capitalism. In vehemently attacking the man's arguments, he made an impression on the other party members with his oratory skills and, according to Hitler, Baumann left the hall acknowledging unequivocal defeat. Impressed with Hitler's oratory skills, Drexler encouraged him to join. On the orders of his army superiors, Hitler applied to join the party. Although Hitler initially wanted to form his own party, he claimed to have been convinced to join the DAP because it was small and he could eventually become its leader.

In less than a week, Hitler received a postcard stating he had officially been accepted as a member and he should come to a committee meeting to discuss it. Hitler attended the committee meeting held at the run-down Altes Rosenbad beer-house. Normally, enlisted army personnel were not allowed to join political parties. In this case, Hitler had Captain Karl Mayr's permission to join the DAP. Further, Hitler was allowed to stay in the army and receive his weekly pay of 20 gold marks a week. At the time when Hitler joined the party, there were no membership numbers or cards. It was in January 1920 when a numeration was issued for the first time and listed in alphabetical order Hitler received the number 555. In reality, he had been the 55th member, but the counting started at the number 501 in order to make the party appear larger. In his work Mein Kampf, Hitler later claimed to be the seventh party member, but he was in fact the seventh executive member of the party's central committee. After giving his first speech for the DAP on 16 October at the Hofbräukeller, Hitler quickly became the party's most active orator. Hitler's considerable oratory and propaganda skills were appreciated by the party leadership as crowds began to flock to hear his speeches during 1919–1920. With the support of Drexler, Hitler became chief of propaganda for the party in early 1920. Hitler preferred that role as he saw himself as the drummer for a national cause. He saw propaganda as the way to bring nationalism to the public.

From DAP to NSDAP 
The small number of party members were quickly won over to Hitler's political beliefs. He organized their biggest meeting yet of 2,000 people on 24 February 1920 in the Staatliches Hofbräuhaus in München. Further in an attempt to make the party more broadly appealing to larger segments of the population, the DAP was renamed the National Socialist German Workers' Party (NSDAP) on 24 February. Such was the significance of Hitler's particular move in publicity that Harrer resigned from the party in disagreement. The new name was borrowed from a different Austrian party active at the time (the Deutsche Nationalsozialistische Arbeiterpartei, i.e. the German National Socialist Workers' Party), although Hitler earlier suggested the party to be renamed the Social Revolutionary Party in order to distance the party from association with socialism. It was Rudolf Jung who persuaded Hitler to adopt the NSDAP name.

Membership 
Early members of the party included:
 Anton Drexler
 Dietrich Eckart
 Gottfried Feder
 Karl Harrer
 Hermann Esser
 Ernst Boepple
 Hans Frank
 Adolf Hitler
 Ernst Röhm
 Alfred Rosenberg
 Rudolf Jung

References
Informational notes

Citations

Bibliography

 
 
 
 
 
 
 
 

1919 establishments in Germany
Adolf Hitler
Far-right political parties in Germany
German nationalist political parties
Pan-Germanism
Political parties established in 1919
Political parties disestablished in 1920
Political parties in the Weimar Republic
Nazi Party
Anti-communist parties